Kimmell is an unincorporated census-designated place in Sparta Township, Noble County, in the U.S. state of Indiana.

History
Kimmell was founded in 1831, and was named after the Kimmell family of settlers. The post office at Kimmell has been in operation since 1888.

Geography

Demographics

References

Census-designated places in Noble County, Indiana
Census-designated places in Indiana